Buddies in Bad Times Theatre is a Canadian professional theatre company. Based in Toronto, Ontario, and founded in 1978 by Matt Walsh, Jerry Ciccoritti, and Sky Gilbert, Buddies in Bad Times is dedicated to "the promotion of queer theatrical expression".

Although the company eventually achieved notoriety and success in the 1980s as a queer theatre company, it was not founded with that intent. Buddies' original focus was on staged adaptations of poetry. However, during the 1980s, under the sole leadership of Sky Gilbert, Buddies developed a distinctly queer aesthetic and practice. The company is known for its work that was unapologetically political, fiercely pro-sexual, and fundamentally anti-establishment. In 1983, Sue Golding joined the company as its founding Board President—a post which she held until 1995, playing an instrumental role in shaping the direction of the organization. Some of the company's earliest commercial and critical successes included productions of Gilbert's Lana Turner has Collapsed! (1980), The Dressing Gown (1984), Drag Queens on Trial (1985), and The Postman Rings Once (1987), Don Druik's Where is Kabuki? (1989), as well as the Sex Tours of the Church-Wellesley community hosted by Gilbert's drag persona Jane.

History

Buddies in Bad Times (BIBT) was established and incorporated in Toronto in 1979. Gilbert was the company's first artistic director. Sue Golding played a pivotal role as President from 1983 to 1995.

Buddies' inaugural production was a Gilbert play, Angels in Underwear. An anthology of Beat poetry, Angels starred Walsh as Jack Kerouac and Ciccoritti as Allen Ginsberg, and was performed at The Dream Factory on Queen Street in Toronto in September 1978.

Gilbert, Walsh and Ciccoritti, along with playwright Fabian Boutilier, subsequently founded the Rhubarb Festival of Canadian Plays, first produced by the theatre company at The Dream Factory in January 1979 and featuring short plays written by local, unknown playwrights directed by all four of Rhubarb's founders.

The name Buddies in Bad Times was taken from the poem of the same title by the French poet Jacques Prévert. It was originally the expression of the close friendship that prevailed between Walsh and Gilbert during their years at York University and The Three Schools of Art.

Shortly after Walsh and Ciccoritti stopped working with the company in its infancy, Gilbert moved its artistic direction toward the then emerging gay subculture of Toronto. Buddies has become one of North America's premiere examples of the synthesis between so-called gay culture and modern theatre and has spawned the successful careers of dozens of Canadian actors, playwrights and directors.

1979: The beginning

In 1979, The Rhubarb! Festival was held for the first time.

Buddies was one of the six influential companies who banded together to form The Theatre Centre in Toronto—a movement of theatre that was hailed as the "next wave". Of all the companies involved in the venture, Buddies found an artistic and social connection to the work Nightwood theatre was doing and an alliance was formed that showed itself in six collaborative Rhubarb! Festivals.

By 1983 Buddies in Bad Times Theatre was receiving funding from four levels of government.

1985–1993

In 1985 BIBT gave birth to the 4-Play Festival which premiered at Theatre Passe Muraille. This festival was dedicated exclusively to the promotion of lesbian and gay writers and creators. Seed Shows came into being in 1986. Opportunity without intervention was a growing ethos in how Sky Gilbert was building BIBT. Seed Shows such as DNA Theatre's This Is What Happens in Orangeville won a jury prize at The Festival Des Ameriques in Montreal. Platform 9 Theatre's Steel Kiss was also produced: born out of Rhubarb! and developed through Seed. It is now known as one of the most important plays of the 1980s.

BIBT's first mainstage production, Sky Gilbert's The Postman Rings Once opened at TWP (12 Alexander Street) in 1987. Tim Jones became general manager in 1988. By 1990 BIBT had been directly or indirectly nominated or presented with numerous and various cultural awards. 1990 marked the year that Sky Gilbert's Drag Queens in Outer Space hit the stages of Seattle and San Francisco.

BIBT was a company on the move that utilized venues within Toronto to create exciting hit shows. In 1991, BIBT set up its first permanent performance space at 142 George Street. Sky Gilbert's Suzie Goo: Private Secretary went on to win a Dora Mavor Moore Award for Best Production. Daniel MacIvor's 2-2-Tango was nominated for a Floyd S. Chalmers Canadian Play Award and Don Druick's Where Is Kabuki? was nominated for a Governor General's Award. BIBT was also integral in its support of smaller independent companies, such as Robin Fulford's Platform 9, Ed Roy's Topological Theatre and the newly formed Augusta Company by Daniel Brooks, Don McKellar and Tracy Wright.

By 1993, BIBT had successfully negotiated a 40-year lease with the city and entered into a symbiotic partnership with The Alexander Street Theatre Project, a company formed primarily to raise funds and manage expenses for the renovation of the theatre. Sue Golding was President throughout this period.

1994–1998

In 1994 BIBT opened its first season at Alexander Street with Sky Gilbert's ambitious More Divine.

The community support for the company was at an all-time high; Strange Sisters reached a new kind of notoriety, and an explosion of activity under one roof like the city of Toronto had never seen.

1994–1998 saw many exciting and challenging things happen for BIBT. Queerculture, 4-Play and Seed Shows were all laid to rest. Associate artists took on a larger role of shaping the subsidized work in the building and as a result there was tremendous success with Daniel MacIvor's Here Lies Henry and The Soldier Dreams. Sky Gilbert's Ten Ruminations on An Elegy Attributed to William Shakespeare toured to glowing reviews in Great Britain with stops in London, Brighton, and Cardiff. Two anthologies of Sky Gilbert's plays were also published.

In 1996, Tim Jones resigned as general manager. 1997 marked the highly successful Martha Steward Projects and The Attic, the Pearls and Three Fine Girls and the resignation of founding artistic director Sky Gilbert. Sarah Stanley was appointed as Sky Gilbert's successor in April, and Gwen Bartleman was appointed general manager in July.

During the 1997–1998 season, BIBT's profile rose with the premiere of Brad Fraser's Martin Yesterday and Diane Flacks' Random Acts, plus the 20th anniversary of Rhubarb! curated by festival director Franco Boni. RHUBARB-O-RAMA!, an anthology of works generated from twenty years of the Rhubarb! Festival, was published.

1997–1998 heralded a renewed commitment to play development, marked by the birth of the Ante Chamber Series and the development of six scripts under the eye of company dramaturg Edward Roy.  In 1997, the theatre also hosted the inaugural We're Funny That Way! festival of LGBT comedians.

BIBT's programming grew more ambitious in 1998–1999; the company produced the world premiere of R.M. Vaughan's camera, woman, the Toronto premiere of Live With It by Winnipeg playwright Elise Moore and the repertory run of Robin Fulford's Steel Kiss and Gulag.

1999–2000

In 1999, following a national search, David Oiye was hired as BIBT's third artistic director.

Expanding its commitment to gay, lesbian and bisexual youth, BIBT launched its first annual Summer Youth Arts Programme in 1999, providing a summer-long outlet for twelve queer youth, and two year-round internship positions.

On the producing front, BIBT's 1999 tribute to Canadian rock legend Carole Pope, Shaking the Foundations, received Dora Mavor Moore Award nominations for Outstanding Production, Direction, Musical Direction, and won in the category of Outstanding Female Performance (Paula Wolfson).

BIBT also increased its commitment to new play development in 1999 by introducing Winter Fling in partnership with The Shaw Festival, to develop and present workshops of new Canadian scripts.

2000–2003

Over the 2000–2001 season, BIBT explored the notion of a national queer repertoire by programming Vancouver-based artist Dorothy Dittrich's award-winning musical When We Were Singing, Winnipeg playwright Ken Brand's comedy Burying Michael, and PileDriver! from Edmonton-based companies Guys in Disguise and Three Dead Trolls in a Baggie.

For the 2001–2002 season Buddies produced the largest production in its history with Kelly Thornton's ambitious Peep Show (Designed by Steve Lucas and Sherri Hay, with lighting by Michael Kruse), and also received eight Dora Mavor Moore Award nominations for da da kamera]'s production of In on It by Daniel MacIvor, and Damien Atkins' much lauded Real Live Girl, which won in the categories of Outstanding Male Performance and Outstanding New Musical.

During the 2002–2003 Gwen Bartleman resigned as general manager. Jim LeFrancois stepped in to oversee operations as Buddies' producer in the spring of 2003. Shows presented that season included James Harkness' rural drama Homage and Stem (created by Greg MacArthur, Ruth Madoc-Jones, Erika Hennebury, Clinton Walker), developed through Buddies' developmental programmes.

The 2002–2003 season also launched a naughty late night series in Tallulah's Cabaret dubbed the Friday Superstar Series, featuring the outrageous, ultra-queer talents of such folks as Sasha Van Bon Bon, Kitty Neptune, R. Kelly Clipperton, Pretty Porky and Pissed Off, Will Munro, Kids on TV, and Buddies' resident tranny punk Josh Schwebel. A highlight of the 25th Rhubarb! Festival included two works from a contingent of Czech artists.

2003–2006

In 2003–2004 Buddies celebrated its 25-year contribution to Toronto's cultural landscape by programming its largest season ever. The year was decidedly retrospective in flavour, and welcomed back key artists who helped shape the company over the years. Sky Gilbert returned to direct the silver anniversary season opener, his much-lauded Play Murder (which starred Jason Cadieux, Marc Gushuliak, Ellen Ray Hennessy, Ann Holloway, Jane Johanson and Edward Roy) and artistic director David Oiye directed a re-mount of one of Gilbert's biggest hits, Suzie Goo: Private Secretary.

Moynan King returned as associate artist, and was instrumental in launching Hysteria: A Festival of Women. Moynan also joined forces with Franco Boni on The Retro Rhubarb! Festival, which featured new work and pieces from past incarnations of the festival. Hits of The Retro Rhubarb! Festival included Hope Thompson's Green and The Magic Key and Peter Lynch's Colourful Conversation. Damien Atkins' Real Live Girl returned, as did a remount of Brad Fraser's Unidentified Human Remains and the True Nature of Love from Crow's Theatre.

For 2004–2005, offered a season of theatrical works by Greg MacArthur (Snowman), Daniel MacIvor (da da kamera's Cul-de-sac), Mirha-Soleil Ross (Yapping out Loud), Marie Clements (Native Earth's The Unnatural and Accidental Women), Adam Bock (Theatrefront's Swimming in the Shallows), Darren O'Donnell (Mammalian Diving Reflex's Suicide-site Guide to the City), Ann Holloway (Kingstonia), Sky Gilbert (Cabaret Company's Rope Enough), and an adaptation by Judith Thompson (Volcano's take on Ibsen's Hedda Gabler).

King also enjoyed tremendous success with the second incarnation of Hysteria: A Festival of Women, which saw artists flock to Buddies from as far afield as Sweden (The Lion Kings). Damien Atkin's Real Live Girl toured to London (The Grand Theatre) and Winnipeg (Manitoba Theatre Centre), and in June Cheap Queers returned home to Buddies.

The company's 2005–2006 season included shows such as R.M. Vaughan's The Monster Trilogy, Marie Brassard's Jimmy, the Scandelles' remount run of Under the Mink, Salvatore Antonio's heartfelt family drama In Gabriel's Kitchen and Daniel MacIvor's A Beautiful View.

The company also workshopped a new play by award-winning artist d'bi young, and supported presentations of Ed Roy's The Golden Thug (Topological Theatre) and Sky Gilbert's Bad Acting Teachers and the workshop of Diane Flacks' new one-woman show Bear With Me (Nightwood Theatre). The company's Queer Youth Arts Programme brought youth into Buddies throughout the season, to learn about theatre, see shows and meet artists and to create their own performance for Pride Week.

2006–2007

The company's 2006–2007 season, dubbed ArtSexy2, was an experiment in structure, development and presentation. Instead of full-scale productions, the company instead presented a series of works-in-development, which allowed the audience a unique opportunity to see artists developing non-linear work in workshop settings. Most of the presentations were only two or three performances long and the season was divided into three "waves" of development, each around a core theme: Wave One - The Creator/Performer; Wave Two - Audience Relocation (anchored around the presentation of Mammalian Diving Reflex's Diplomatic Immunities); and Wave Three - Art & Sex (which included a presentation by porn activist/performance artist Annie Sprinkle; and Gilbert's play Will The Real JT Leroy Please Stand Up).

The season also included Keith Cole's sprinkler tap-dance from Mine in Wave One; Emergency Exit's moody forest of headphones as part of their installation, the evening news; and the Scandelles' Neon Nightz, an exploration of the relationship between strip clubs and the Church in Montreal in the 1990s. Also developing work in ArtSexy2 were Edwige Jean-Pierre, Andrew Kushnir, Nathalie Claude, Small Wooden Shoe, Ed Roy, Kids on TV, Mikiki, 2BoysTV and One Reed Theatre.

This schedule was anchored by Necessary Angel's Dora award-winning production of Insomnia and the farewell season of one of Toronto's most challenging companies, da da kamera, which staged three solo shows, directed by Daniel Brooks and performed for the last time by core artist Daniel MacIvor. Here Lies Henry, Monster and House proved to be some of the most successful runs in Buddies' history.

2007–2008

The 2007–2008 season, Guilty Pleasures, offered an array of performance styles.

ArtHouse Cabaret, a modern queer vaudeville conceived and directed by Jim LeFrancois and David Oiye, opened the 2007–2008 season. The set design for this multidisciplinary production completely transformed the theatre, and featured Keith Cole as the omniscient MC, burlesque from The Scandelles, Shane MacKinnon (the Beefcake Boys) and Stephen Lawson and Aaron Pollard (2Boys.tv of Montreal). ArtHouse Cabaret won Outstanding New Musical at the 2008 Dora Mavor Moore Awards.

The 07-08 line-up also included a large-scale burlesque from The Scandelles (Who's Your DaDa?), a new musical from Sky Gilbert (Happy), an ultra-sexy modern dance programme (Art Fag), and the return of Hardworkin' Homosexuals' Cheap Queers.

2008–2009

Celebrating its third decade, Buddies' rebellious youthful tendencies began to collide with considerations for the future. 2008–2009 saw the programming of an exceptionally rich season.

Two young artists developed through Buddies' Queer Youth Arts Programme took centre-stage. Agokwe, written and performed by Waawaate Fobister, enjoyed critical acclaim and won a leading six Dora awards. Agokwe nabbed awards for outstanding production of a play, best new play, and outstanding performance by a male in a principal role, while Ed Roy was honoured for his direction. Mark Shyzer, also from the Queer Youth Arts Programme, wrote and performed Fishbowl: A Concise, Expansive Theory Of Everything. This limited run performed to sold-out audiences.

Buddies continued long-time partnerships with Canada's cutting-edge cultural artists and independent theatre companies. Crow's Theatre, Mammalian Diving Reflex, The Scandelles, Necessary Angel, Native Earth Performing Arts, 2boys.tv, Small Wooden Shoe and Sky Gilbert were also included as part of the 2008–2009 season.

2008–2009 saw its share of successes, but like so many art organizations during this season, Buddies in Bad Times Theatre felt increased pressure related to the economic downturn. Gay4Pay, written by Edward Roy, fell victim and had its scheduled mid-season run cancelled. In the midst of 'bad times', Buddies' extended family of artists came forward to help weather the financial storm. Daniel MacIvor performed his one-man show Cul-de-Sac, raising a significant amount of much needed revenue. Sharron Matthews and an entourage of Canada's finest musical theatre talent presented Sing Out, Louise! The Scandelles bared all in Funhouse. Comedians Gavin Crawford and Elvira Kurt also mounted a joint comedy show, Together Again for the First Time.

During the 2008–2009 season, major changes to staffing occurred. Jim LeFrancois resigned as artistic producer and David Oiye announced that 2008–09 would be his last season as artistic director.

2009–present

Following an extensive national search for a new artistic head, the company underwent two major shifts in leadership in 2009. Award-winning director Brendan Healy became the artistic director in October 2009, and acting general manager Shawn Daudlin officially became the general manager of the company in December 2009.

The programming for the 2009–10 season, the final season programmed by Oiye, featured work led by female creators. This decision was in response to a national study on gender parity in Canadian theatre which revealed that female representation in our theatres is shockingly low. Participating artists included The Scandelles (Neon Nightz), Nina Arsenault (The Silicone Diaries), The Independent Aunties (Breakfast) and Nathalie Claude (The Salon Automaton).

Healy's first season in 2010/11 featured many artists long associated with the company, such as Sonja Mills, Evalyn Parry, Sky Gilbert and 2boys.tv, while also announcing some new directions for the company. For the first production of the season, Healy helmed the English-Canadian premiere of Sarah Kane's play Blasted. Rhubarb! returned with a new festival director, Laura Nanni, and featured, for the first time, off-site performance in public spaces. Buddies also embarked on two major national tours of productions from its recent repertoire, Agokwe and The Silicone Diaries. The company took home five Dora Mavor Moore Awards (for outstanding production, lighting design, set design, sound design and direction) for its production of Blasted. This year also saw a 25 per cent growth in attendance for the company's main stage shows and festivals which included sold-out runs of Blasted, The Silicone Diaries and Spin.

The 2011/12 season opened with a production of Jean Genet's classic text The Maids, and included work from Native Earth Performing Arts, Modern Times Stage Company, and legendary lesbian performance group Split Britches. The season also hosted a revival of Larry Kramer's seminal AIDS play The Normal Heart (produced by Studio 180 Theatre), and the Toronto premiere of Margaret Atwood's The Penelopiad (Nightwood Theatre) which went on to win several Dora Mavor Moore Awards.

Buddies in Bad Times' 2012/13 season looked to empower the individual as an agent of social change. It began with Tawiah M'carthy's Obaaberima, which was originally developed as a part of the Young Creators Unit (YCU) in 2009. In the Spring Canadian theatre icon Daniel MacIvor returned to Buddies with his darkly poetic play Arigato, Tokyo. The season also included Sky Gilbert's A Few Brittle Leaves, a partnership with performance company Ecce Homo to present Of a Monstrous Child: a gaga musical and Studio 180's The Normal Heart. Laura Nanni returned as the Rhubarb Festival Director and oversaw the return of the wildly successful One-To-One Performance Series and Mobile Works projects. The 34th Rhubarb Festival broke all previous attendance records and engaged almost 200 artists. The season saw 22 Dora Mavor Moore Award nominations overall, including three awards for Obaaberima, music, set design and Outstanding Production. In 2012, Buddies was voted Toronto's Best Small Theatre Company by Now Magazine.

The 2012/13 season also saw the completion of two large-scale initiatives: a three-year Audience Development Project and a strategic planning process that helped revise Buddies' mandate, and articulated a long-term vision for the company.

Buddies' 2013/14 season marked the company's 35th Anniversary. Its programming included the world premiere of PIG, directed by Artistic Director Brendan Healy, the return of the Strange Sisters Festival, and the premiere of The Gay Heritage Project. The 35th Rhubarb Festival, helmed by Festival Director Laura Nanni, marked the company's historic milestone with a 35 Performances for 35 Year Cabaret. The Festival looked to explore ideas of heritage and archiving while looking forward to possible Queer futures.

Buddies enters its next 35 years as the premier cultural centre for Toronto's LGBT community, as the top destination for all audiences seeking cutting-edge theatre in Toronto, as a leading centre for the creation and presentation of alternative theatre in Canada, and as a preferred employer in the arts in Toronto. Buddies is truly a one-of-a-kind place in the world that is dedicated to the nurturing, protection, and celebration of queer culture.

In 2020, during the COVID-19 pandemic in Canada, Buddies in Bad Times and CBC Arts collaborated on the production of Queer Pride Inside, a television special featuring LGBTQ performers, for CBC Gem as part of the online component of Pride Toronto.

Artistic directors
Sky Gilbert (1979–1997)
Sarah Garton Stanley (1997–1999)
David Oiye (1999–2009)
Brendan Healy (2009–2015)
Evalyn Parry (2015–2020)

References

External links
 Official website

LGBT theatre in Canada
LGBT culture in Toronto
Theatre companies in Toronto
Queer organizations
LGBT theatre companies
Non-profit organizations based in Toronto
1979 establishments in Ontario
20th-century theatre
21st-century theatre